Hednota perlatalis is a moth in the family Crambidae. It was described by Francis Walker in 1863. It is found in Australia, where it has been recorded from Tasmania.

References

Crambinae
Moths described in 1863